Teresa Giudice (born May 18, 1972) is an American television personality best known for starring in The Real Housewives of New Jersey. Besides appearing on the show, Giudice wrote multiple New York Times bestseller cookbooks and was featured on Donald Trump's The Celebrity Apprentice 5 (2012).

In December 2015, she was released from prison after serving 11 months of a 15-month sentence for fraud, while her husband and four daughters resided in the Towaco section of Montville, New Jersey. She is known for her extravagant lifestyle and highly publicized financial and legal troubles leading up to her prison sentence. Her husband, born Giuseppe but called Joe, began his 41-month sentence in March 2016.

Early life 
Giudice was born Teresa Gorga in Paterson, New Jersey, to Giacinto and Antonia Gorga, Italian immigrants from Sala Consilina, Campania. She and her younger brother Giuseppe "Joey" Gorga were raised in the Roman Catholic faith. She studied fashion marketing at Berkeley College in New Jersey.

Career 
Giudice worked for Macy's as an associate buyer. She has been a cast member of The Real Housewives of New Jersey since season 1.

In 2009, one of Giudice's infamous stunts on the show was her flipping a dinner table on Danielle Staub for telling Giudice to "pay attention" to Staub. This led to Teresa flipping the table between the two and coining a unique term in the Housewives vernacular by calling Staub a "prostitution whore".

Since starring on Housewives, Giudice has co-authored three successful cookbooks that include recipes handed down from her mother: Skinny Italian (May 4, 2010), Fabulicious (May 3, 2011), and Fabulicious!: Fast & Fit (May 8, 2012) alongside a memoir, co-written with K.C. Baker, Turning the Tables: From Housewife to Inmate and Back Again, revolving around her time in prison. Giudice's sixth book, Standing Strong, was released on October 3, 2017. All four books have been New York Times Best Sellers. Giudice also created Fabellini, a line of bellini cocktails, as well as a haircare line with Jerel Sabella named after Giudice's daughter Milania.

In 2012, Giudice joined the cast of The Celebrity Apprentice 5 (also known as The Apprentice 12), and ultimately raised $70,000 for her selected charity, The NephCure Foundation. She was fired in episode 12 (airdate May 6, 2012), after placing fifth.

She is a committee member for Project Ladybug, a charity founded by fellow RHONJ co-star Dina Manzo.

In May 2017, Giudice, Joe Gorga and Melissa Gorga opened a restaurant named Gorga's Homemade Pasta & Pizza in East Hanover, New Jersey. In January 2018, the restaurant closed.

Giudice starred in The Real Housewives Ultimate Girls Trip, a spin-off featuring various women from The Real Housewives franchise, that premiered on Peacock in November 2021.

On September 8, 2022, Giudice was announced as a contestant on season 31 of Dancing with the Stars. She was partnered with Pasha Pashkov. They were eliminated week 2, finishing in 15th place.

Personal life 
Teresa was married to Giuseppe "Joe" Giudice (an Italian citizen born in Saronno, Italy, and brought to Paterson, New Jersey, by his parents when he was a one-year-old), who had worked as a construction builder and restaurant owner in New Jersey. They have four daughters together: Gia (b. 2001), Gabriella (b. 2004), Milania (b. 2006), and Audriana (b. 2009). After her release from prison, Giudice became a competitive bodybuilder.

Teresa Giudice's mother, Antonia Gorga, died in March 2017. Her father, Giacinto Gorga, died on April 3, 2020.

Teresa Giudice's brother, Joe Gorga, married Melissa Gorga in 2004. From 2011 to 2013, Teresa and Melissa's rivalry was broadcast for three seasons of The Real Housewives of New Jersey. Their relationship started blossoming after Teresa was convicted and spent 11 months in prison.

In December 2019, it was announced that Giudice and her husband had separated after 20 years of marriage. Seen on the reality television show, this was due to the rumors of infidelity and prison convictions. Teresa filed for divorce a few months later and in September 2020, a rep confirmed the divorce had been finalized.

In July 2020, Giudice started dating Luis  Ruelas, and they became engaged in October 2021. The couple officially wed in August 2022.

Giudice supported Donald Trump in the 2016 United States presidential election saying "I think he's amazing. I think he'll make a great president".

Convictions 

In October 2009, the Giudices filed for bankruptcy. An auction of furniture from their Montville, New Jersey, home was initially scheduled for August 22, 2010, but was postponed and then canceled as the couple withdrew their petition for bankruptcy.

On July 29, 2013, Teresa and Joe Giudice were charged with conspiracy to commit mail fraud, wire fraud, and bank fraud, making false statements on loan applications, and bankruptcy fraud in a 39-count indictment. The indictment also charged Joe Giudice with failure to file tax returns for tax years 2004 through 2008, during which time he allegedly earned nearly $1 million. Teresa's attorney told the Associated Press she would plead not guilty and "we look forward to vindicating her."

On August 14, 2013, the two pleaded not guilty in federal court to financial fraud charges.

Joe Giudice stood trial on November 19, 2013, on individual charges that he allegedly used marriage and birth certificates belonging to his brother to fraudulently obtain a driver's license in 2010. Giudice's own driver's license had been suspended following a DUI arrest January 13, 2010. After he was convicted, Joe's license was suspended for 12 months, and he was sentenced to 20 days of community service. As he employed the same defense attorney in both trials, U.S. District Judge Esther Salas moved the date of the tax case, involving both Teresa and Joe, from October 8, 2013, to February 24, 2014.

On March 4, 2014, Teresa and Joe entered a guilty plea to 41 counts of fraud, following a deal struck with federal prosecutors. The couple was accused of engaging in bank, mail, wire, and bankruptcy fraud, which allegedly saw them net over $5 million over a 10-year period. On October 2, 2014, Teresa was sentenced to 15 months in a federal prison; Joe was sentenced to 41 months, followed by potential deportation to Italy. Together, the couple must also pay $414,000 in restitution. Teresa and Joe were allowed to stagger their sentences so one parent could stay with their children. She began her sentence first, on January 5, 2015. She surrendered herself to the Federal Correctional Institution in Danbury, Connecticut (seven hours ahead of schedule). At Danbury, Teresa was known as Inmate No. 65703-050 and was scheduled for a two months' early release on February 16, 2016. Giudice was ultimately released on December 23, 2015.

In July 2015, Giudice's primary residence in Towaco was in the primary stages of foreclosure, while the couple's summer home in Beach Haven West, in Stafford Township, New Jersey, was foreclosed; the latter was auctioned in a sheriff's sale on August 18, 2015, and received no bids. The residence was bought back by the Giudice's mortgage holder for $100. In November 2015, Giudice's primary residence was no longer in foreclosure.

In December 2014, Giudice filed a $5 million lawsuit against her bankruptcy lawyer, James Kridel, for failing to meet with her before filing bankruptcy documents. In March 2017, the lawsuit was announced to be moving forward.

In June 2018, it was announced Giudice's bankruptcy case from 2009 had been dismissed. Giudice will pay restitution to the New Jersey state department of treasury and the IRS.

In March 2019, Joe Giudice completed his sentence and was transferred to an ICE facility to wait on a pending case about whether he shall be deported or not to his native country, Italy, as he never became a United States citizen despite living in the United States since he was a year old. In October 2019, Giudice returned to Italy to await a decision on the case. In April 2020, Giudice's third appeal was denied.

Filmography

Bibliography

Notes

References

External links 
 
 
 

1972 births
21st-century American criminals
American cookbook writers
American people convicted of fraud
American prisoners and detainees
American socialites
American women in business
American women non-fiction writers
American writers of Italian descent
American people of Lombard descent
Catholics from New Jersey
Criminals from New Jersey
Fitness and figure competitors
Living people
New Jersey Republicans
People from Montville, New Jersey
People from Stafford Township, New Jersey
The Real Housewives cast members
Women cookbook writers
Writers from Paterson, New Jersey
The Apprentice (franchise) contestants
21st-century American women